Backhaul may refer to:
Backhaul (telecommunications), in telecommunications, concerned with transporting traffic between distributed sites (typically access points) and more centralized points of presence
Backhaul (broadcasting), in the broadcast TV industry, the point-to-point transmission, usually by satellite, of a feed from a remote location to the studio
Backhaul (trucking), in the transportation world, when a truck takes a load back to its  originating terminal, e.g. to get a driver home